"" is a live video of Shiina Ringo released on February 21, 2007.
The situation of the live concert "" on from December 12 through 21, 2005 is recorded on the DVD.
Her private office "黒猫堂/Kuroneko-dou" made a plan of this DVD, and distributed it.

Outline
"Dai Ikkai Ringohan Taikai, Adult Only" was the limited event held in December 2005 only for the members of Shiina’s official fan club "".

The former half of this event was held in Ebisu the garden hall on December 12 and December 13, and she invited only 1500 guests for the event. In the first half, Tokyo Jihen performed, and in the second half, Shina Ringo performed as a solo singer with Saito Neko and her orchestra.

The latter half of this event was held in Daikanyama UNIT on December 20 and December 21. She invited only 500 guests for the event.
In the first half, Shina Ringo performed as a solo singer. She invited Hasegawa Kiyoshi (長谷川きよし), the folk singer, to the guest performance. Maki (マキ), his daughter, also participated in this event as a flutist. In the second half, Tokyo Jihen performed. 

"Shiina Ringo with Saito Neko&Matatabi Orchestra" out of the former half and "the duet of Shiina Ringo and Hasegawa Kiyoshi" out of the latter half are recorded in this DVD.

Set list

The former half

Tokyo Jihen
Non-recording
 ""
 ""
 ""
 ""
 ""
 ""
 ""

Shiina Ringo×Saito Neko
 "" 
 ""
 ""

 ""
 "la salle de bain" (the bathroom)

 
 ""
 ""

The latter half

Shiina Ringo×Hasegawa Kiyoshi＋MAKI 
 "" (Only December 20)
 "" (Only December 21)
 Fly me to the moon
 ""
 ""
 ""
 "", ("Aquellos Ojos Grises")
 ""

Tokyo Jihen
Non-recording besides Rakujitsu
 ""
 ""
 ""
 ""
 ""
 ""
 ""
 ""
 ""

Co-stars 
Tokyo Jihen
Saito Neko
Matatabi Orchestra
Hasegawa Kiyoshi
Hasegawa Maki

2005 video albums
Ringo Sheena video albums